Hussein al-Imam (in Arabic حسين الإمام; February 8, 1951 in Egypt – May 17, 2014) was a well-known Egyptian film musician, actor and producer.

El-Imam began his career playing music with his brother Moody El-Emam. This developed into an artistic partnership between the two brothers and they created Thebes band which released five albums together.

Al-Imam wrote the soundtracks of many Egyptian films including Kaboria (1990) which he also produced, starring Ahmed Zaki and Ice Cream in Gleem (1992) starring Egyptian pan-Arab pop star Amr Diab which El-Imam produced as well. He also wrote the musical score for a number of theatrical works on stage like Albanda, Lamma baba yenam and Lil kibar faqat as well as a number of Egyptian television series. He composed a number of songs particularly for Mohamed Mounir. He also established his own musical studio.

Al-Imam, who acted in over 70 films was featured in several of the movies. On television, he was the host of several popular candid camera and talk / entertainment shows like Hassan ala al hawaa, Hussein ala al hawaa, Fasel w nwasel, Eh en nizam and Kalaam Hussein.

Personal life
He was the son of the late Hassan al-Imam, one of Egypt's most acclaimed filmmakers. His brother Moody Al-Imam is also a well known writer composer of film soundtracks. Hussein al-Imam was married to Egyptian actress Sahar Rami. He died in 2014 reportedly of a cardiac arrest. He was 63.

Filmography
Acting
1975: Bamba Kashar
1979: El ganna taht qadamayha as Ahmad
1990: Kaboria as Sliman
1998: Pizza Pizza as Bibars
1999: Ashik wadi fi Roxy as al-Akhdar
2002: Kazalek fil Zamalek as Nizar
Other roles
1978: Hub faq al burkan1979: Sultanat al tarab1992: Ice Cream fi Gleem as Ziko
2009: Ihki ya Shahrazad (English title Scheherazade, Tell Me a Story)
2013: Samir abu NilProducer
1990: Kaboria1992: Ice Cream in Gleem1996: EstakozaSoundtracks
1973: As Sukkariyah1974: Bamba Kashar1975: Badi'a Masabni1976: El Karawan lou shafayef1978: Shuqqa w arousa ya rab1978: Hisab al siniin1978: Bidoun gawaz afdal1981: Lahzet da'af1982: Al Selkhana1986: Bukra ahla min naharda1986: Al Ferrisa1987: Al Mal'oub1989: Taman al ghurba1991: Samaa' hess1992: Ouyoun al saqr1992: Imra'a ayela lil suquut1992: Ice Ceam fi Gleem1994: Disco, disco1995: Atabat el settat1995: Samt el kherfan1996: Ya dunya ya gharami1996: Al Ghadiboun1996: Estakuza1999: Ashik wadi fi Roxy2000: Al warda al hamraa2000: Al namas2001: Ibn ezz2002: Kazalek fil Zamalek2002: El-LimbyTelevision
TV seriesLil adalah wougouh kathiraSaeed baa'es ta'ees as Saeed Farhat Ahzan Maryam as Aboul AlaaAl shaytan la ya'ref el hobYak Hanna al jiran (Moroccan series)Adam wa gamilaTV showsHassan ala al hawaaHussein ala al hawaaFasel w nwaselEh en nizamKalaam HusseinTheatre Music compositionBalloAlabandaLamma baba yenamLil kibar faqat''

References

Egyptian composers
Egyptian male film actors
1951 births
2014 deaths
Egyptian male television actors